Stephen John "Steve" Osborne (born 1963) is a British record producer, living in Bath, England. He has worked with a wide variety of musicians, including Suede, the B-52s, A-ha, New Order, Elbow, U2, Happy Mondays, Placebo, Gregory Porter, Doves, KT Tunstall, Vanessa Carlton, and Simple Minds.

Career
During the 1990s, Osborne was half of the Perfecto Records team, a production and remix collaboration with Paul Oakenfold; they worked with Happy Mondays, U2, and other artists. He and Oakenfold were part of the 1990s dance music act Grace which existed from 1994 to 1997.

Osborne worked with Cat's Eyes on their critically acclaimed album, released in April 2011. At the 2012 Soundedit Festival in Poland, Osborne received the prestigious 'The Man with the Golden Ear' Award.

In 2000 as part of Perfecto, Osborne was replaced by Andy Gray who went on to remix Moby's "Natural Blues", U2's "Beautiful Day", and compose the music for Big Brother UK with Oakenfold under the name Elementfour.

Production and mixing credits

 2016: A-ha – Producer & Mixer – "Objects in the Mirror" (single)
 2016: A-ha – Producer & Mixer – "Cast in Steel" (single)
 2015: Young Guns = Producer & Mixer – Ones and Zeros
 2014: Vanessa Carlton = Producer & Mixer – Liberman
 2014: Charlie Simpson = Producer & Mixer – Long Road Home
 2014: Simple Minds = Producer & Mixer – Big Music
 2012: Invaders = Producer & Mixer – "Hummingbird"
 2012: Charlie Simpson = Producer & Mixer – "Farmer & His Gun"
 2012: Urusen = Producer & Mixer – This Is Where We Meet
 2012: Morten Harket – Producer & Mixer – Out of My Hands
 2011: Vanessa Carlton – Producer & Mixer – Rabbits on the Run
 2010: Cat's Eyes – Producer & Mixer – Cat's Eyes
 2010: A-ha – Producer & Mixer – "Butterfly, Butterfly (The Last Hurrah)" (single)
 2009: A-ha – Producer & Mixer – Foot of the Mountain (single)
 2009: A-ha – Producer & Mixer – "Nothing Is Keeping You Here" (single)
 2008: Starsailor – Producer & Mixer – All the Plans
 2008: The Twang – Producer & Mixer – "Ice Cream Sunday"
 2008: The B-52's – Producer & Mixer – Funplex
 2007: KT Tunstall – Producer – Drastic Fantastic
 2006: KT Tunstall – Producer & Mixer – KT Tunstall's Acoustic Extravaganza
 2006: Union of Knives - Producer & Mixer - Violence and Birdsong
 2006: Grace – Producer & Mixer – Debut
 2006: The Fratellis – Mixer – Costello Music
 2006: Young Love – Producer – Too Young to Fight It 2006: Brookville – Producer – Life in the Shade 2006: Clearlake – Producer & Mixer – Amber 2005: Thrice – Producer & Mixer – Vheissu 2005: Ivy – Producer & Mixer – In The Clear 2005: The Departure – Producer & Mixer – Dirty Words 2005: Colour of Fire – Producer & Mixer – Pearl Necklace 2005: Syntax – Producer & Mixer – Meccano Mind 2004: KT Tunstall – Producer & Mixer – Eye to the Telescope 2004: Chikinki – Producer & Mixer – Lick Your Ticket 2004: Longview – Producer & Mixer – "Nowhere", "Sleep" and "Still"
 2004: Magnet – Producer & Mixer – Chasing Dreams (EP)
 2005: Aqualung – Remixer – "Strange and Beautiful"
 2003: The Leaves – Assistant Producer & Mixer – "Breathe"
 2003: Lamb – Producer – "Between Darkness and Wonder"
 2003: Peter Gabriel – Assistant Producer & Mixer – Growing Up 2003: Peter Gabriel – Remixer – The Tower 2002: Doves – Producer & Mixer – The Last Broadcast 2001: New Order – Producer & Mixer – Get Ready 2001: Sophie Ellis-Bextor – Producer & Mixer – "Music Gets the Best of Me"
 2000: Doves – Producer & Mixer – Lost Souls 2000: Elbow – Producer & Mixer – Asleep in the Back 2000: Starsailor – Producer & Mixer – Love Is Here 1999: Suede – Producer & Mixer – Head Music 1999: Suede – Producer & Mixer – "Electricity"
 1999: Suede – Producer & Mixer – "She's in Fashion"
 1998: Placebo – Producer & Mixer – Without You I'm Nothing 1997: U2 − Staring at the Sun single − Additional production
 1997: U2 – Producer Pop 1997: Curve – Producer & Mixer – "Chinese Burn" and "Coming Up Roses"
 1996: Lush – Producer & Mixer – Lovelife 1993: Deacon Blue – Producer & Mixer – Whatever You Say, Say Nothing 1992: U2 − Remixer – "Even Better Than the Real Thing" (Remixes) (remix single) 
 1990: Happy Mondays – Producer & Mixer – Pills 'n' Thrills and Bellyaches''

References

External links
AllMusic biography
Official site at 140db production collective

English electronic musicians
English record producers
Living people
1963 births
Remixers